Hudo Brezje is a settlement in the hills above the right bank of the Sava River in the western Krško Hills in east-central Slovenia. It belongs to the Municipality of Sevnica. The area is part of the historical region of Lower Carniola and is now included in the Lower Sava Statistical Region.

References

External links
Hudo Brezje at Geopedia

Populated places in the Municipality of Sevnica